InterExec is an executive agency based in the United Kingdom, providing senior businessmen similar services to those provided in other professions such as a literary agent, talent agent and a sports agent. Headquartered in the City of London.

History
The agency was established in 1976 as the first agency of its kind when it began working for employed executives seeking a career move, at a time when an executive was often employed by the same company for life and few understood the concept of planning one's career to maximize income, skills and expertise.

Business model
Working with senior executives earning £150K to £2million+, InterExec offers a service which is individual and confidential, analysing the candidates strengths and potential in order to identify their career pinnacle. InterExec maintains a Unique International Network which enables them to promote Senior Executives for Unadvertised Vacancies, predominantly through providing a service to some 15,000 executive search consultants globally.

External links
 InterExec
 Financial Times Report
 The Times Online
 London Online
 London Evening Standard
 The Wharf 
 Richard Donkin

References

Consulting firms established in 1976
Companies based in the City of London
Employment agencies of the United Kingdom
1976 establishments in England